Carl August Tamm (8 June 1840 – 30 January 1905), was a Swedish politician, landowner and rittmeister.

August Tamm was born at Stafby, Uppsala County. Tamm was a member of the Riksdag's First Chamber from 1900 to 1905.

Tamm married Baroness Emma Åkerhielm af Margretelund in 1872.

References 

1840 births
1905 deaths
Swedish politicians
Swedish nobility
August
Commanders First Class of the Order of Vasa
People from Uppsala County